"Time to Pretend" is a song by the American indie band MGMT, released as the lead single from their debut studio album Oracular Spectacular (2007) on March 3, 2008. An earlier version had been released on their Time to Pretend EP. The single was released as a 7" and CD single featuring the B-sides "Weekend Wars" (BBC Radio 1 Session) and "Metanoia", respectively. In early 2009, the song was re-released in the UK. The song was ranked at number 493 on Rolling Stones list of "The 500 Greatest Songs of All Time", and its parent album, Oracular Spectacular, was ranked at number 494 on the publication's additional list of "The 500 Greatest Albums of All Time". The song was also ranked at number 90 on NMEs list of The 500 Greatest Songs of All Time.

Background
The track was originally recorded for the Time to Pretend EP (2005). It was re-recorded for the Oracular Spectacular album.

From a quote from live at Abbey Road:

Music video
The music video for the song contains references to Alejandro Jodorowsky's 1973 film The Holy Mountain  and the 1954 novel Lord of the Flies. The video was directed by Ray Tintori. Tiscali Music gave the video a rating of 10 out of 10.  A 3D version of the video with minor changes to the original was also produced.

Track listing

Reception
Kevin O'Donnell wrote in Rolling Stone that "Time to Pretend is a space-rock gem that mocks the clichéd coke-and-hookers rock-star lifestyle, over big synth whooshes."

The song hit #38 on the Mediabase Alternative chart. Time critic Josh Tyrangiel named Time to Pretend the #8 song of 2008. The song was #3 on Rolling Stones list of the 100 Best Songs of 2008, #4 on NME's Best Singles of 2008, The song was ranked at number 493 on Rolling Stones list of "The 500 Greatest Songs of All Time". NME ranked "Time to Pretend" as the 2nd best song of the 2000s.  In October 2011, NME placed it at number 12 on its list "150 Best Tracks of the Past 15 Years".

Charts

Weekly charts

Year-end charts

Certifications

Television performances
MGMT performed the song "Time to Pretend" in a 3.5 minute slot on Late Show with David Letterman on January 8, 2008, ending the performance with a nod to The Doors' "Light My Fire". The song subsequently hit #19 on the Mediabase U.S. Alternative chart. They later performed the song on Late Night with Conan O'Brien on May 15, 2008.  The band returned to Letterman for a 4-minute slot on May 11, 2010.

In popular culture

Television
"Time to Pretend" has featured in a number of TV shows, including HBO's show Pacquiao-Hatton 24/7, episode 2, which originally aired on April 18, 2009, the Season 1 finale of Gossip Girl on May 19, 2008, and featured prominently at the end of the second series finale of popular UK channel E4's Skins but was later omitted from the DVD release of the series due to issues acquiring the rights. It was also featured in the series premiere of 90210 on September 2, 2008 and in the pilot episode of HBO's Girls and the pilot episode of The Magicians. It has also appeared in ITV's live coverage of Champions League football. "Time to Pretend" was also used on the Argentine TV show Exitosos Pells, showing bloopers from the series. The song was also used in the series The Revolution Will Be Televised. It was also featured in the season one finale of The Imperfects.

Film
"Time to Pretend" has been used in the 2008 films (or in the trailers for) Sex Drive, How to Lose Friends & Alienate People and 21, an early trailer for the Tim Burton film Alice in Wonderland, the 2011 film Warrior and the official trailer for Spider-Man: Homecoming. The song (in a "Super Clean Version" that censors the profanity and drug references) was also featured on the soundtrack of the 2008 film 21. It also appeared in the film Changeland.

Commercials
The song was the theme music for Manchester-based UK radio station Key 103/Piccadilly Magic 1152's new football show Total Football covering Manchester United and Manchester City games. It was also included in one of HMV's holiday commercials. The song was also used for the Polish TV commercial for the Ferrero SpA Duplo chocolate bar aired from December 2009.

Video games
 The song was featured in Shaun White Snowboarding, released in November 2008, along with another track from Oracular Spectacular, "Of Moons Birds Monsters". It has also been featured in several skateboarding videos.
 The song was featured on the NHL 2K10 soundtrack.
 Sections of this song appear in the PlayStation 3 game LittleBigPlanet.
 The song and its music video appears on the soundtrack of Guitar Hero Live as part of its GHTV service.

Covers
 BBC Radio 1 Live Lounge sessions:
Kaiser Chiefs, September 2008
Paolo Nutini, November 2009
Leddra Chapman - BBC Radio 2 Janice Long live session, January 2010 
Jón Þór Birgisson from Sigur Rós, March 2010
 Broderick Smith and Patience Hodgson (of The Grates) performed a duet of the song live on the RocKwiz Episode 74 in January 2009.
Covered by Weezer at the Reading Festival 2010.
Covered by Sunday Girl, premiering on her YouTube channel in August 2010.
Covered by Neil Hannon of The Divine Comedy for Dermot O'Leary's BBC Radio 2 Saturday Sessions 2010.
Covered by Anthony Jasmin during the final of the seventh season of the Danish version of X Factor.
Covered by The Reach, single released October 2015
Cover by Kiki and Herb as the opening song of their 2016 cabaret show Kiki & Herb: Seeking Asylum! at Joe's Pub.
Sampled by Sigala and James Arthur in their 2020 single Lasting Lover
Covered by Black Country, New Road in 2021. It was later included in the bands Never Again EP.

Remixes
 The Welsh drum and bass artist High Contrast produced a drum and bass remix of "Time to Pretend". This remix was featured on Radio 1 during the Sub Focus Essential Mix of 25 April 2009.

References

External links
 

2008 singles
MGMT songs
2007 songs
Songs written by Andrew VanWyngarden
Columbia Records singles
Songs written by Benjamin Goldwasser
Songs about drugs
Satirical songs